Minnesota State Highway 15 (MN 15) is a  highway in south-central and central Minnesota, which runs from Iowa Highway 15 at the Iowa state line and continues north to its northern terminus at its interchange with U.S. Highway 10 outside of Sartell and Sauk Rapids, north of St. Cloud.

Route description
MN 15 serves as a north–south highway between Fairmont, Madelia, New Ulm, Hutchinson, and St. Cloud in south-central and central Minnesota.

MN 15 parallels MN 4 throughout its route in south-central and central Minnesota.

Flandrau State Park is located near MN 15 in Brown County on the Cottonwood River. The park is located just south of New Ulm.

MN 15 is a four-lane highway on the west side of St. Cloud from Interstate 94 (I-94) to U.S. Highway 10 (US 10). MN 15 crosses the Bridge of Hope at the Mississippi River between Sartell and Sauk Rapids.

History
MN 15 was authorized in 1920, 1933, and 1950.

The section of MN 15 between New Ulm and the Iowa state line was originally Minnesota Constitutional Route 15, dating back to 1920.

The section of MN 15 between St. Cloud and Kimball was originally part of Constitutional Route 24.

The middle section of MN 15 was authorized in 1933, the northernmost section in 1950. This northerly section was originally part of old MN 152 and was routed through downtown St. Cloud. Now, it bypasses central St. Cloud to the west side of town.

By 1940, only two short gravel sections of MN 15 remained, both paved by 1953.

In the 1970s, MN 15 through the St. Cloud area was planned to be constructed as a freeway, providing a high-speed connection between I-94 and US 10]]. However, funding fell short of completing the freeway beyond MN 23 and County Road 75 (CR 75, 2nd Street South). As a result, it was eventually decided that right-of-way needed to build interchanges would be sold off so the remaining segment of MN 15 across the Mississippi River, connecting to US 10, could be built. Therefore, from 2nd Street South to US 10, the highway is currently built as an expressway with signalized intersections.
As of now, MN 15 is able to serve traffic, with stretches posted at a  speed limit. However, continuing increases in traffic in the St. Cloud area will require the highway to be eventually converted to a freeway in the long term (post 2030).

Major intersections

References

015
Transportation in Benton County, Minnesota
Transportation in Brown County, Minnesota
Transportation in Martin County, Minnesota
Transportation in Meeker County, Minnesota
Transportation in McLeod County, Minnesota
Transportation in Nicollet County, Minnesota
Transportation in Sibley County, Minnesota
Transportation in Stearns County, Minnesota
Transportation in Watonwan County, Minnesota
New Ulm, Minnesota